Carol Chell (born 1941) is a British children's television presenter and TV executive. She originally qualified as a teacher, and produced many educational TV shows in the 1960s. She is best known for her work as a long-serving presenter from 1966 to 1988 on Play School and from 1971 to 1980 on Play Away.

Early life
She attended Nottingham Girls' High School, then a direct grant grammar school.

Career

Teacher
For a time she taught at Pierrepont Secondary Modern School for Girls, in Nottingham; also teaching there at the time was Brian Clark, who would become a television writer, writing Telford's Change.

Television
Chell appeared as herself as part of a group of 'time-travellers' trying to solve puzzles on the planet Arg in episode 1 of series 2 of BBC TV quiz series The Adventure Game on 2 November 1981 (available on the DVD release of the series from Simplymedia). She took part in the ATV schools series Starting Out in 1982. She later worked for satellite TV station The Children's Channel, where she was head of pre-school programming until the channel's demise in 1998.

Chell appeared alongside Johnny Ball on a celebrity edition of Pointless, featuring stars of children's television. This aired on 20 September 2014 on BBC One.

Personal life
She married Ian Price (of Costock) on Saturday 9 October 1965 at St Peter's Church in Tollerton, Nottinghamshire. At the time, her parents lived in Christchurch, Dorset. Chell and Price have 2 daughters, Emily & Sophie, and two grandchildren called Ella and Jack.

References

BBC television presenters
British television presenters
People educated at Nottingham Girls' High School
People from Rushcliffe (district)
Living people
1941 births